Sebastián Agustín Gallegos Berriel (born 18 January 1992) is a Uruguayan footballer who plays for Central Español as an attacking midfielder or winger.

Club career
Gallegos started playing in Danubio F.C. youth system alongside Uruguay U15 and Uruguay U17. After his good performances with the Uruguay national football team youth levels, many well known European clubs showed interest in Gallegos. But finally, on 20 July 2009, he signed a contract with Atlético Madrid B. On 31 July 2011, he was loaned out one season to CF Badalona. After playing eight games in the 2011–12 season, Gallegos returned to his country. On 23 August 2012, he joined Peñarol on a two-year contract. On 9 September 2013, he was signed on a free transfer by Como Calcio 1907, where he played 10 games and scored 2 goals in the 2013–14 Serie C2 season. The following year, he changed teams again and joined Petrolul Ploiești in Romania.

National career
Gallegos played the 2009 FIFA U-17 World Cup with Uruguay scoring 5 goals in 5 matches and became the championship's top scorer, a title shared with other three players. He had also been capped by the U20 team for the 2011 South American Youth Championship.

Honours

Club
Peñarol
Primera División Uruguaya (1): 2012–13

References

External links

1992 births
Living people
People from Treinta y Tres Department
Uruguayan footballers
Uruguayan expatriate footballers
Uruguayan Primera División players
Peruvian Primera División players
Serie C players
Chilean Primera División players
Liga I players
National Premier Leagues players
Association football forwards
Atlético Madrid footballers
CF Badalona players
Como 1907 players
Peñarol players
FC Petrolul Ploiești players
Real Garcilaso footballers
Cobresal footballers
Sydney United 58 FC players
Centro Atlético Fénix players
Central Español players
Expatriate footballers in Chile
Uruguayan expatriate sportspeople in Chile
Expatriate footballers in Peru
Uruguayan expatriate sportspeople in Peru
Expatriate footballers in Spain
Uruguayan expatriate sportspeople in Spain
Expatriate footballers in Italy
Uruguayan expatriate sportspeople in Italy
Expatriate footballers in Romania
Uruguayan expatriate sportspeople in Romania
Expatriate soccer players in Australia
Uruguayan expatriate sportspeople in Australia